Urogentias is a genus of flowering plants belonging to the family Gentianaceae.

Its native range is Tanzania.

Species:
 Urogentias ulugurensis Gilg & Gilg-Ben.

References

Gentianaceae
Gentianaceae genera